United Arab Emirates competed at the 1992 Summer Paralympics in Barcelona, Spain. The one competitor from United Arab Emirates won no medals and so did not place in the medal table.

See also 
 United Arab Emirates at the Paralympics
 United Arab Emirates at the 1992 Summer Olympics

References 

United Arab Emirates at the Paralympics
Nations at the 1992 Summer Paralympics